= CFHOF =

CFHOF may refer to:

- Canadian Football Hall of Fame
- College Football Hall of Fame

== See also ==
- List of halls and walks of fame
